Hadreule is a genus of tree-fungus beetles in the family Ciidae.

Species
 Hadreule elongulata Gyllenhal, 1827
 Hadreule fukudai M. Chûjô, 1940
 Hadreule heiroglyphica Reitter, 1877
 Hadreule japonica Nobuchi, 1955
 Hadreule sinica Pic, 1954
 Hadreule subrobusta Miyatake, 1955

References

Ciidae genera